"Toulouse" is a song by Dutch DJ and music producer Nicky Romero. It was released as a single on December 19, 2011, in the Netherlands and January 2, 2012, in the United States through Spinnin' Records. A music video for the song was uploaded to YouTube on May 9, 2012.

On August 20, 2020, an edit was released for the song with its music video following a few weeks later.

Music video
The music video for the song, lasting four minutes and twenty seconds, was unofficially uploaded on May 9, 2012, to YouTube. It was directed by Timo Pierre Rositzki and has garnered over 459 million views as of June 2022. On May 8, 2017, the official video was taken down due to a copyright claim by Spinnin' Records, the label for the song. However, from June that year, the copyright claim was retracted. Throughout the video, several people can be seen wearing Guy Fawkes masks. Despite the fact that the song was named "Toulouse", the music video was filmed in Hamburg, Germany, including in the Reeperbahn district.

Track listing
 Spinnin' — SP451

 Spinnin' — SP487

Spinnin' — TBA

Charts

Release history

References 

2011 singles
2011 songs
Nicky Romero songs
Spinnin' Records singles
Songs written by Nicky Romero